Lech dl Dragon (Drachensee in German) is a proglacial lake in the Dolomites of South Tyrol, Italy. The lake is located on a ledge on the north side of the Sella Group. It is created periodically from the melting of a glacier that is hidden beneath the scree from the rock towers, above. 

The lake disappeared in the 1970s, reappeared in 2002, then disappeared in 2007. As of 2011, the lake contains water. 

The lake is named from a legend of the inhabitants of Val Gardena. The legend describes the screams of a dragon living in the area.

References

 Multi-disciplinary investigation of an active rock glacier in the Sella Group (Dolomites; Northern Italy)

External links

Lakes of South Tyrol